Enrique "Tatita" Baca (born January 30, 1996) is a Mexican professional stock car racing driver. He currently competes in the NASCAR PEAK Mexico Series, driving the No. 9 for Alpha Racing-Rolcar Motorsport.

Racing career

Xfinity Series
Baca made his Xfinity Series debut at Watkins Glen, driving the No. 40 car for MBM Motorsports in a partnership with NextGen Motorsports. He started 35th and finished 31st in his Xfinity Series debut. He competed in the next race at Watkins Glen. This time, he drove the No. 13 car, also for MBM Motorsports in a partnership with NextGen Motorsports. He started 29th, and finished 18th, improving greatly on his previous result.

On January 22, 2018, it was announced that Baca would be racing for NextGen Motorsports part-time along with Marcos Gomes and Landon Huffman. However, this did not end up happening due to a lack of sponsorship and the team encountering financial problems. NextGen would not field their Xfinity team and only compete in the Truck and K&N East Series that year.

Motorsports career results

NASCAR
(key) (Bold – Pole position awarded by qualifying time. Italics – Pole position earned by points standings or practice time. * – Most laps led.)

Xfinity Series

 Season still in progress 
 Ineligible for series points

K&N Pro Series East

PEAK Mexico Series

References

External links
 
 

Living people
NASCAR drivers
1975 births
Mexican racing drivers
Sportspeople from Monterrey